Hingoli district (Marathi pronunciation: [ɦiŋɡoliː]) is an administrative district in the state of Maharashtra in India. The district is headquartered at Hingoli. The district occupies an area of 4,526 km2 and has a population of 11,77,345 of which 15.60% were urban. Hingoli was actually known as the Nizams military base as it was bordered with Vidharbha. In that era military troops, hospitals, veterinary hospital were in operation from Hingoli. Being a military base the city was one of the important and famous places of the Hyderabad state. One of the twelve Jyotirlinga shrines, the Aundha Nagnath is located in Hingoli district about 25 km south-west from district headquarter.

 it is the third least populous district of Maharashtra (out of 36), after Sindhudurg and Gadchiroli.

Officer

Members of Parliament

Hemant Patil (SHS)

Guardian Minister

list of Guardian Minister

District Magistrate/Collector

list of District Magistrate / Collector

History

The territory of the present district became part of Bombay state in 1956 and Maharashtra state in 1960 as part of Parbhani district. This district was carved out from Parbhani district on 1 May 1999 with five own tehsils: Hingoli, Kalamanuri, Sengaon, Aundha Naganath, and Basamat.

Geography
Hingoli is situated at the northern part of Marathwada in Maharashtra. Borders of Hingoli are surrounded by districts Washim and Yavatmal in northern side, Parbhani in western side, and Nanded at south-eastern side. There are two medium-sized dams present on both East and West sides of the district namely Isapur dam and Yeldari dam, Isapur dam provides water to irrigation purpose whereas Yeldari dam caters to irrigation as well as production of hydroelectricity. One minor dam named Siddheshwar also used for irrigation purpose in district.

Demographics

As of the 2011 Census of India, Hingoli district has a population of 1,177,345, roughly equal to the nation of Timor-Leste or the US state of Rhode Island. This gives it a ranking of 401st in India (out of a total of 640). Its population growth rate over the decade 2001-2011 was 19.43%. Hingoli has a sex ratio of 942 females for every 1000 males, and a literacy rate of 78.17%. Scheduled Castes and Scheduled Tribes make up 15.51% and 9.51% of the population respectively.

At the time of the 2011 Census of India, 83.53% of the population in the district spoke Marathi, 6.86% Urdu, 4.81% Hindi and 3.25% Lambadi as their first language.

Governance
This district is divided into two sub-divisions, which are further divided into five talukas. Hingoli sub-division is divided into three talukas: Hingoli, Kalamnuri and Sengaon. Basmath sub-division is divided into two talukas: Aundha and Basmath.

There are three Vidhan Sabha constituencies in this district: Basmath, Kalamnuri and Hingoli. All three are part of Hingoli Lok Sabha constituency.

Economy
In 2006 the Ministry of Panchayati Raj named Hingoli one of the country's 250 most backward districts (out of a total of 640). It is one of the twelve districts in Maharashtra currently receiving funds from the Backward Regions Grant Fund Programme (BRGF).

Places of interest

Hindu temples and shrines
Some of the notable Hindu temples are as follows:
Mallinath Digambar Jain Temple, Shirad Shahpur
Aundha Nagnath is one of the twelve jyotirlingas from Hindu mythology. It is situated in the town of same name, Aundha, in Hingoli district.
Tulja Devi Sansthan, Ghota
Sant Namdev Sansthan Narsi, Narsi
Tulja Bhavani Devi Temple, or Tulaja Devi Sansthan, Kalamnuri
Jaleshwar Mahadev Temple (built in the lake), Hingoli
Shri Datta Mandir, Mangalwara, Hingoli
Dakshinmukhi Hanuman Temple, Khatkali
Barashiv Hanuman Mandir, Barashiv
Kanifnath Temple, Khairi Ghumat, Sengaon 
Jagdamba Devi Temple, Sengaon
Chintamani Ganapati Temple, Hingoli

See also

Make in Maharashtra
Tourism in Marathwada

Notes

External links

Hingoli district website

 
Districts of Maharashtra
Minority Concentrated Districts in India
1999 establishments in Maharashtra
Marathwada
Aurangabad division